Grassy Point is an unincorporated community in Hardin County, in the U.S. state of Ohio.

History
Grassy Point had its start as a pioneer trading post. The community was named for the cleared but grassy condition of the original site. A post office called Grassy Point was established in 1840, and closed in 1841.

References

Unincorporated communities in Hardin County, Ohio
Unincorporated communities in Ohio
1840 establishments in Ohio